James Egan Moulton Jnr (1870 – 3 February 1937) was a Tongan-born Australian Methodist minister, headmaster and sportsman.

Early life
Moulton was the son of Emma (née Knight) and James Egan Moulton. His early years were spent in Tonga before attending Newington College as a boarding student from 1882 until 1888. Whilst still a schoolboy he played for NSW against the 1888 British Lions Team touring Australia and against Queensland in inter–colonial games until 1892. He has been described as being one of the greatest three-quarters that NSW Rugby has seen. He was also a tennis player and cricketer. He graduated with a Bachelor of Arts from the University of Sydney in 1892.

Tongan ministry
He was ordained and was appointed to the staff of the Tupou College where he was Principal until 1905.

Australian ministry
On his return to Sydney he served in city and country circuits, including Paddington, New South Wales, Parkes, Albury and Windsor before his retirement.

See also
 John Fletcher Moulton, uncle
 Richard Green Moulton,  uncle
 William Fiddian Moulton, uncle
 James Hope Moulton, cousin 
 John Egan Moulton, grandson

References

1841 births
1937 deaths
Australian Methodist ministers
Australian headmasters
Methodist theologians
James Egan Jnr
People educated at Newington College
20th-century Methodist ministers
Rugby union players from Sydney
Australian rugby union players
Rugby union three-quarters